The Arizona Community College Athletic Conference (ACCAC) is a junior college conference in Region 1 of the National Junior College Athletic Association (NJCAA). Conference championships are held in most sports and individuals can be named to All-Conference and All-Academic teams.

Member schools

Current members
The ACCAC currently has 17 full members, all are public schools:

Notes

Future members
The ACCAC will have one new full member, which is also a public school:

Notes

Sports

Men's sponsored sports by school

Women's sponsored sports by school

Notes

Women's varsity not sponsored by the Arizona Community College Athletic Conference that are played by schools

NJCAA national titles

See also
National Junior College Athletic Association (NJCAA)

External links

NJCAA Website

 
NJCAA conferences
College sports in Arizona